Camana Bay is a small town north of George Town, Cayman Islands. It has a transient daily population of around 2,500; and has many amenities, including restaurants, cafés, shops, a wine factory, a cinema, a gym, and many office blocks with a few banks. There are also a few blocks of apartments with terraced views, as well as healthcare centers and a supermarket. Construction on the town commenced not long after Hurricane Ivan hit the Cayman Islands in September 2004.

References

Populated places in the Cayman Islands